Greenfield or Greenfields may refer to:

Engineering and business
 Greenfield agreement, an employment agreement for a new organisation
 Greenfield investment, the investment in a structure in an area where no previous facilities exist
 Greenfield land, a piece of undeveloped land (the opposite of brownfield land)
 Greenfield project, a project which lacks any constraints imposed by prior work
 Greenfield status, a term used after a decommissioned site is restored to its original condition prior to any development

Places

Canada
 Greenfield, Edmonton, Alberta, a neighbourhood
 Greenfield, Colchester County, Nova Scotia
 Greenfield, Hants County, Nova Scotia
 Greenfield, Kings County, Nova Scotia
 Greenfield, Queens County, Nova Scotia

United Kingdom
 Greenfield, Bedfordshire, England
 Greenfield, Greater Manchester, England
 Greenfield, Glasgow, Scotland
 Greenfield, Flintshire, Wales

United States
 Greenfield, Arkansas
 Greenfield, California, in Monterey County
 Greenfield, Kern County, California
 Greenfield, Iowa
 Greenfield, Illinois
 Greenfield, Indiana
 Greenfield, Massachusetts
 Greenfield, Minnesota
 Greenfield, Mississippi
 Greenfield, Missouri
 Greenfield, Mississippi County, Missouri
 Greenfield, New Hampshire
 Greenfield, New York
 Greenfield, Ohio
 Greenfield, Oklahoma
 Greenfield (Pittsburgh), Pennsylvania, a neighborhood
 Greenfield, Tennessee
 Greenfield (Castalian Springs, Tennessee), a historic farmhouse
 Greenfield (Charlotte Court House, Virginia), a historic plantation house
 Greenfield (Fincastle, Virginia), a historic plantation site
 Greenfield, Wisconsin, a city
 Greenfield, La Crosse County, Wisconsin, a town
 Greenfield, Monroe County, Wisconsin, a town
 Greenfield, Sauk County, Wisconsin, a town
 Greenfield Township (disambiguation)

Elsewhere
 Greenfield Road, Dublin, Ireland
 Greenfield Stadium (Trelawny), a multi-use stadium in Trelawny, Jamaica

Schools
 Greenfield Community College (disambiguation)
 Greenfield School (disambiguation)

Other uses
 Greenfield (surname)
 Greenfield Festival, an annual rock music festival held on the outskirts of Interlaken, Bern, Switzerland
 Greenfield, an informal North American name for metallic flexible electrical conduit
 Greenfield filter, an inferior vena cava filter that is surgically placed to prevent pulmonary emboli
 Greenfield, an open-air rock festival in Switzerland in the Canton of Berne, held for three days in June
 Greenfield (Minecraft), a fictional city created in Minecraft

See also
 Greenfield Park (disambiguation)
 Green Fields (disambiguation)